Micropterix stuebneri is a species of moth belonging to the family Micropterigidae. It was described by Zeller, Werno and Kurz in 2013. It is only known from the Sierra Nevada in Spain.

The forewing length is 2.6–3 mm for males and 3.2-3.5 mm for females. The forewings are dark purple to bluish-violet with mostly golden bronze markings. The hindwings are golden bronze, apically tinged purplish. Adults have been recorded on wing in June.

Etymology
The species is named in honour of Andreas Stübner, who collected the species first during a trip around the Sierra Nevada.

References

Micropterigidae
Moths described in 2013
Moths of Europe